Limnophyes angelicae is a species of dark brown chironomid midge. It has been recorded in the British Isles, Germany and European Russia and is assumed to be widespread in Europe.

Unlike many Limnophyes species, in which the larvae live in semiaquatic or damp terrestrial habitats, the larvae of L. angelicae are fully aquatic, living in shallow water at the margins of lakes.

References

Chironomidae
Insects described in 1990